This is a list of New Hampshire state parks. State parks in the U.S. state of New Hampshire are overseen by the New Hampshire Division of Parks and Recreation.

New Hampshire state parks

State historic sites

Other state protected areas
Other areas of note still owned by the state but not maintained.

See also
List of U.S. national parks
List of New Hampshire state forests

References

External links

New Hampshire Division of Parks and Recreation New Hampshire Department of Natural and Cultural Resources

 
New Hampshire state parks